David Pastrňák (born 25 May 1996) is a Czech professional ice hockey right winger for the Boston Bruins of the National Hockey League. Nicknamed "Pasta", Pastrňák was selected by the Bruins in the first round, 25th overall, of the 2014 NHL Entry Draft and made his NHL debut that year. Internationally, Pastrňák has played for the Czech national team at both the junior and senior level, including at four World Championships.

Early life
Pastrňák's father, Milan, wanted him to play ice hockey. Following a lengthy battle with cancer, Milan died in 2013. Pastrňák cites this as the reason why he began practicing and training so hard, hoping to make it as a hockey player for his father.

Playing career
During the 2011–12 season, Pastrňák led the Czech under-18 league in goals (41) and points (68). After being drafted by the Boston Bruins with the 25th pick overall in the 2014 NHL Entry Draft, Pastrňák signed a three-year, entry-level contract on 15 July 2014.

Pastrňák attended the Bruins' training camp for the 2014–15 season before being assigned to the Providence Bruins, the team's American Hockey League (AHL) affiliate, on 7 October 2014. He made his NHL debut with the Bruins on 24 November, logging 7:53 of ice time in a 3–2 overtime loss to the Pittsburgh Penguins. He scored the first two goals of his NHL career against Ray Emery on 10 January 2015, as the initial pair of goals resulting in a 3–1 Bruins' road win over the Philadelphia Flyers. On 29 March, Pastrňák became the youngest Bruins' player in history to score an overtime, game-winning goal in regular season play in Boston's 2–1 road win over the Carolina Hurricanes. At the end of the season, he was one of just two players selected in the 2014 NHL Entry Draft to play in more than 40 NHL games during the 2014–15 season, and along with fellow Bruins' rookie Ryan Spooner, led the team in offense during the last 20 games of the season.

During a Bruins' regular season home game in the 2015–16 season, against the Penguins on 24 February 2016, Pastrňák became the youngest Bruins' player ever to score a penalty shot goal, which he scored only four minutes into the game, as the first goal en route to a 5–1 Bruins' defeat of the Penguins. His popularity in Boston has led to Bruins' fans giving him the nickname "Pasta". On 28 October 2016, Pastrňák was suspended two games for an illegal check to the head of New York Rangers defenceman Daniel Girardi. The 2016–17 season proved to be a breakout year for Pastrňák, who recorded 34 goals and 70 points to lead the Bruins in scoring. Additionally, Pastrňák scored two goals and four points for the team during the 2017 playoffs.

Entering the off-season, Pastrňák was a restricted free agent. On 14 September 2017, the Bruins re-signed Pastrňák to a six-year, $40 million contract extension worth $6.7 million annually.

During the closing months of the 2017–18 season, on 13 March 2018, Pastrňák scored his first NHL hat-trick during a come-from-behind 6–4 Bruins' road win over the Carolina Hurricanes. On 14 April, Pastrňák recorded another hat-trick along with three assists in a 7–3 home win over the Toronto Maple Leafs in game two of the Bruins' First Round series during the 2018 playoffs. He also became the youngest player in NHL history to score six points in a single playoff game beating Wayne Gretzky's record. The Bruins defeated the Maple Leafs in seven games but lost to the Tampa Bay Lightning in the Second Round.

During the 2018–19 season, Pastrňák played in his first NHL Winter Classic against the Chicago Blackhawks, scoring a goal to help the team win 4–2. On 2 January it was announced Pastrňák would appear in his first National Hockey League All-Star Game. On 16 January 2019, in a game against the Philadelphia Flyers Pastrňák became the all-time leader for most goals in Boston Bruins history before the age of 23 passing Barry Pederson. Pastrňák won the 2019 NHL All-Star Skills Competition Accuracy Shooting hitting five targets in 11.309 seconds. On 31 January, in a game against the Philadelphia Flyers Pastrňák scored 2 goals including his 30th of the season becoming the first player in Bruins history to record three 30+ goal seasons before the age of 23 passing the two of Bobby Orr, Cam Neely and Barry Pederson. However, after recording 66 points so far that season, Pastrňák injured a tendon in his left thumb, and was listed to be out for two weeks. By March 19, Pastrňák's left thumb tendon had healed enough for his return to NHL play, and by his fifth game back from being sidelined, on March 27 he scored his third career hat-trick, his latest coming against the New York Rangers with two assists in setting a career-high five-point night; on the way to a 6–3 Bruins home ice victory.

On 14 October 2019, Pastrňák scored all four Bruins goals in a victory over the Anaheim Ducks, making him the 25th player in Bruins history to score four goals in one game. In the 2019–20 NHL season, Pastrňák finished with 48 goals tied with Alexander Ovechkin of the Washington Capitals for most goals in the NHL making him the first Bruins player to win the Maurice "Rocket" Richard Trophy since it was created in 1999.

During the 2020–21 season, Pastrňák scored 20 goals to give him a career regular-season total of exactly 200. In the second round of the playoffs, he scored a hat trick against the New York Islanders to help give the Bruins a 1–0 series lead on 29 May 2021.

On 2 March 2023, Pastrňák signed a $90 million, eight-year contract extension with the Bruins.

International play

Pastrňák has represented the Czech Republic's national teams at every level and has led his team in scoring numerous times. He won bronze at the 2013 Ivan Hlinka Memorial Tournament and in 2014 he won silver at the 2014 IIHF World U18 Championships. In 2016, he joined the Czech Republic national team for the first time at the 2016 IIHF World Championship where the team finished fifth. He also represented the Czech Republic at the 2016 World Cup of Hockey.

Following the Bruins' defeat by the Tampa Bay Lightning in the Second Round of the 2018 playoffs, Pastrňák was invited to participate at the 2018 IIHF World Championship.

Personal life
Pastrňák and his fiancée had a son who was born on 17 June 2021 and died six days later on 23 June.

Career statistics

Regular season and playoffs
Bold indicates led league

International

Awards, honors and records

 Elected Atlantic Division captain of the 2020 National Hockey League All-Star Game.

Records

NHL
 Youngest player in NHL history to record six points in a single playoff game (21 years and 324 days) – 14 April 2018

Boston Bruins
 Youngest player in franchise history to score an overtime, game-winning goal in regular season play – 29 March 2015
 Youngest player to ever score a penalty shot goal – 24 February 2016
 Youngest player to score 30 goals in regular season – 20 years and 291 days
 Most goals in franchise history before the age of 23.
 Most 30+ goal seasons before the age of 23 in franchise history.
 First and only player in franchise history to record three 30+ goal seasons before the age of 23.
 First and only player in Bruins history to score all of his team's 4 goals of a game.
First and only player in Bruins history to win the Maurice "Rocket" Richard Trophy.

Czech Republic
 Youngest player in history to win the Golden Stick Award – 21 years and 27 days.
Most consecutive Golden Hockey Stick Award wins – 5

References

External links

 

1996 births
Living people
AZ Havířov players
Boston Bruins draft picks
Boston Bruins players
Czech expatriate ice hockey players in Sweden
Czech expatriate ice hockey players in the United States
Czech ice hockey right wingers
National Hockey League first-round draft picks
People from Havířov
Providence Bruins players
Rocket Richard Trophy winners
Södertälje SK players
Sportspeople from the Moravian-Silesian Region